The Mawson Arms/Fox and Hounds is a Grade II* listed public house (at non-postal Mawson Row), 110 Chiswick Lane South, Chiswick. The entire terrace of five houses is listed, and they were built in about 1715 for Thomas Mawson; owner of what became the Griffin Brewery. They adjoin one side of Fuller's Griffin Brewery.

The pub was once two separate pubs that now operate as one, but both names have been retained, with the pub having a separate hanging sign for each name, and different names printed along different parts of the building. It is one of very few pubs in England with two official names. Apparently a former landlord had not properly understood the licensing laws, and had split the pub into an ale house and a separate wines and spirits bar.

Architecture

In position the terrace of five houses culminates in this grand end terrace at the London corner of the brewery block.

Its four-storey end-terrace house has long been extended by one-to-two storeys along Mawson Lane to extend the ground floor pub premises. Above (on north and east sides, the principal façades) are tall white-framed sash windows with red dressings. These are set in walls of stock brick from red-brown fading into brown-yellow to the third storey, two bays of which are given over and united into a hard stone or concrete plaque, deep-etched as "THE MAWSON ARMS". The fourth storey is in a mansard roof setting with a further squat loft storey above.

Following the sale of the Griffin Brewery to Asahi, the owners - Fuller, Smith & Turner sold the pub and adjoining buildings in a separate sale.

History

The building, not then a pub, was from 1716 to 1719 a home of the 18th-century poet Alexander Pope. A blue plaque is fixed to the frontage accordingly. He was known for quotations, satirical verse, and for his translation of Homer. Locally he is known for his grander home, Pope Villa at Twickenham, the legacy of which is Pope's Grotto and parts of Radnor Gardens.

The pub was renamed the Fox and Hounds in 1772, and then the Mawson Arms/Fox and Hounds in 1899 (when the it was extended into the corner building). Until 1898, the pub occupied a building 55m south on Mawson Row, next to today's brewery shop.

References

Grade II* listed buildings in the London Borough of Hounslow
Grade II* listed pubs in London
Pubs in the London Borough of Hounslow
Chiswick
Buildings and structures in Chiswick
Fuller's pubs